Dunaybah (also spelled Dneibeh or Danibah) is a Syrian village located in the Salamiyah Subdistrict of the Salamiyah District in Hama Governorate. According to the Syria Central Bureau of Statistics (CBS), Dunaybah had a population of 2,208 in the 2004 census.

References 

Populated places in Salamiyah District